Callionymus mortenseni, Mortensen’s darter dragonet, is a species of dragonet native to the waters around Indonesia where it occurs at depths of around . The specific name honours Ole Theodor Jensen Mortensen (1868-1952), a Danish professor of zoology.

References 

M
Fish described in 1965